Phyllonorycter sorbi is a moth of the family Gracillariidae. It is known from all of Europe, except the Balkan Peninsula.

The wingspan is 7–9 mm. The forewing ground colour is golden brown, often suffused with blackish on the outer half. The clear white markings are partially bordered black.

There are two generations per year with adults on wing in April and May and again in August.

The larvae feed on Cotoneaster integerrimus, Crataegus, Cydonia, Malus sylvestris, Prunus avium, Prunus padus, Pyrus communis, Sorbus aria, Sorbus aucuparia, Sorbus chamaemespilus, Sorbus domestica, Sorbus intermedia and Sorbus torminalis. They mine the leaves of their host plant. They create a lower-surface, yellow-green tentiform mine with a few sharp folds in the epidermis. Pupation takes place in a light brown cocoon in which no frass is incorporated, all frass is deposited in a corner of the mine instead.

References

External links
Lepiforum.de

sorbi
Moths of Europe
Moths described in 1855